Flávio José (born Flávio José Marcelino Remígio in Monteiro) is a Brazilian composer and singer.

Discography

Studio albums
 1977 - Só Confio em Tu
 1994 - Nordestino Lutador
 1995 - Tareco e Mariola
 1996 - O Melhor de Flávio José
 1996 - Filho do Dono
 1997 - Sem Ferrolho e Sem Tramela
 1998 - A Poeira e a Estrada
 1999 - Para Todo Mundo
 1999 - Ao Vivo Sempre
 2000 - Seu Olhar Não Mente (BMG International, N.V.)
 2001 - Me Diz, Amor! (Sony BMG)
 2002 - Palavras ao Vento
 2003 - Cidadão Comum
 2003 - Acústico
 2004 - Pra amar e ser feliz
 2005 - O Poeta Cantador
 2006 - Tá bom que tá danado
 2008 - Dom Cristalino

References
 [ Flávio José] at allmusic

Living people
Brazilian songwriters
21st-century Brazilian male singers
21st-century Brazilian singers
People from Paraíba
Música Popular Brasileira singers
Brazilian composers
Sony BMG artists
21st-century accordionists
Year of birth missing (living people)
20th-century Brazilian male singers
20th-century Brazilian singers